Wu Hou or Wuhou may refer to:

People
 Jin Wu Hou, third ruler of the state of Jin during the Western Zhou Dynasty
 Wu Zetian (624 – 705), empress consort, regnant, and empress dowager of the Zhou dynasty

Places
Wuhou District, a district of Chengdu, Sichuan
Wuhou Subdistrict (武侯街道), a subdistrict of Wolong District, Nanyang, Henan

See also
 
Empress Wu (disambiguation) 
Marquis Wu (disambiguation)
 Mian County, a county of Hanzhong, in the southwest of Shaanxi province, China